Johann Baptist Theodor Gudenus or Johann Baptist, Graf von Gudenus (11 June 1908 – 10 February 1968) was an Austrian sprinter and bobsledder who competed in the 1930s.

Early life 
Johann Baptist Theodor Franz de Paula Philipp Maria was born into the noble Gudenus family, as the younger son of Philipp Friedrich Gabriel Heinrich Maria, Graf von Gudenus (1877-1948) and his wife, Angela Hardt (1880-1973). His paternal grandparents were Count Heinrich Johann Baptist Ghislain von Gudenus (1839-1915) and Countess Ernestine of Thun und Hohenstein (1853-1910).

Career 
At the 1932 Winter Olympics in Lake Placid, New York, he finished 12th and last in the two-man event. Four years later he finished 13th in the four-man event at the 1936 Winter Olympics.

Competing at the 1936 Summer Olympics in Berlin, he was eliminated in the first round of the 400 metres competition.

Personal life 
On 26 June 1939 he was married to Karin Giaver (1905-1980). They had one son and one daughter:
 John, Graf von Gudenus (1940-2016); Austrian politician and father of:
 Johann Baptist Björn, Graf von Gudenus (b. 1976); Austrian politician involved in the "Ibiza affair"
 Sigrid Elisabeth Angela, Gräfin von Gudenus (b. 1943), married to Alexander Roth-Pollack-Parnau (b. 1935)

See also
 List of athletes who competed in both the Summer and Winter Olympic games

References

profile
Men's 400 m results: 1920-36

1908 births
1968 deaths
Austrian male bobsledders
Austrian male sprinters
Olympic athletes of Austria
Olympic bobsledders of Austria
Athletes (track and field) at the 1936 Summer Olympics
Bobsledders at the 1932 Winter Olympics
Bobsledders at the 1936 Winter Olympics